USS Triumph may refer to the following ships of the United States Navy:

 , was an Auk-class minesweeper launched in 1943 and transferred to Norway in 1961
 , is a Stalwart-class ocean surveillance ship launched in 1985; laid up in 1995 and awaiting disposal

United States Navy ship names